Rich Zvosec (born March 13, 1961) is a television broadcaster for ESPN and Fox Sports, motivational speaker and a Telly Award-winning actor, a former American college basketball coach and college administrator. After a 25-year coaching career, he currently serves as the associate athletics director for Arkansas State University.

Life
Zvosec was born in Lorain, Ohio, and graduated from Lorain Catholic High School in 1979. He enrolled at Defiance College, where he played basketball and earned a bachelor's degree in business. In 1988 he became head coach of the St. Francis (NY) Terriers, becoming the youngest Division I coach in the country at age 27. In his third year, the Terriers recorded the program's first winning season since 1978 and had the most DI wins in two decades. Zvosec left in 1991, and became head coach for the University of North Florida North Florida Ospreys, the first in school history. In 1997, he left UNF for one year at Millersville University of Pennsylvania. In 2001, he succeeded Dean Demopoulos as head coach for the University of Missouri–Kansas City Kangaroos. Four of his six teams at UMKC finished with winning records. He also finished with one of the highest winning percentages in conference play while at the school, and the most conference wins in school history.  He led the Kangaroos to a 93-52 win over Kansas State in December 2003, the school's 200th win and their first over the Wildcats.  He left with the highest winning percentage in school history. Zvosec also had the second highest Mid-Continent Conference winning percentage during his six-year tenure. Zvosec was fired from UMKC on March 13, 2007. He subsequently worked as a color commentator for ESPN. Zvosec was inducted into the Lorain Sports Hall of Fame on May 3, 2007. In 2008 Zvosec authored a book about his collegiate coaching experiences called "Birds, Dogs and Kangaroos: Life on the Back Roads of College Basketball"  In 2013, he became the associate athletic director of Arkansas State University.
He is married to Hall of Fame Lacrosse player, Sandy Lanahan and have three children (Colin, Devin and Kailey).

References

1961 births
Living people
American men's basketball coaches
American men's basketball players
Arkansas State Red Wolves athletic directors
Basketball coaches from Ohio
Basketball players from Ohio
College men's basketball head coaches in the United States
Defiance Yellow Jackets men's basketball players
Kansas City Roos men's basketball coaches
Millersville Marauders men's basketball  coaches
North Florida Ospreys men's basketball coaches
Saint Peter's Peacocks men's basketball coaches
Sportspeople from Lorain, Ohio
St. Francis Brooklyn Terriers men's basketball coaches